Éric Lefebvre is a Canadian politician, who was elected to the National Assembly of Quebec in a by-election on December 5, 2016. He represents the electoral district of Arthabaska as a member of the Coalition Avenir Québec caucus. Lefebvre previously served as a city councillor for Victoriaville's city council from 2001 to 2009.  On Valentine's Day 2018, during question period, Lefebvre gave a tribute to all the spouses that supported MNA members and then proposed to fiancée.

Electoral record

Federal
Richmond—Arthabaska

Provincial
Arthabaska

MunicipalVictoriaville - Mayor'''

References 

Living people
Coalition Avenir Québec MNAs
21st-century Canadian politicians
People from Victoriaville
Quebec municipal councillors
Year of birth missing (living people)